Statistics of Swiss Super League in the 1945–46 season.

Overview
The Nationalliga A was contested by 14 teams this season and Servette FC Genève won the championship. La Chaux-de-Fonds and Zürich were relegated. 

The Nationalliga B was contested by 14 teams. Basel won the league and were promoted together with Urania Genève Sport. SC Zug and SC Derendingen finished level on points at the bottom of the table. Zug won the play-off and saved themselves from relegation. Étoile-Sporting and Derendingen were relegated to the 1st League.

League standings Nationalliga A

Results

League standings Nationalliga B

Sources 
 Switzerland 1945–46 at RSSSF

Swiss Football League seasons
Swiss
Football